Shihāb al‐Dīn ibn al‐Majdī (1359–1447 CE) was an Egyptian mathematician and astronomer. His most important mathematical work was "Book of Substance", a voluminous commentary on the Summary of the Operations of Calculations by Ibn al-Banna'.

References

External links 
  (PDF version)

15th-century astronomers
Medieval Egyptian astronomers
15th-century mathematicians
Medieval Egyptian mathematicians
1359 births
1447 deaths
Scientists from Cairo
Mathematicians who worked on Islamic inheritance